Anastasiya Ovsyannikova (born 20 October 1988) is a Paralympian athlete from Russia competing mainly in category T36 sprint events.

Athletics career
Ovsyannikova competed at the 2012 Summer Paralympics in London, where she won a gold medal as part of the women's T35-38 100m sprint relay. As well as her Paralympic success Ovsyannikova won two medals at the 2011 World Championships in Christchurch. A silver as part of the Russian relay team and an individual bronze in the 400 metres. She took time away from athletics after the birth of her son in 2013, and has not appeared at a major international competition since.

Personal history
Ovsyannikova was born in Sterlitamak in the former Soviet Union in 1988. Ovsyannikova was educated at Bashkir Institute of Physical Culture. She is married and gave birth to a son in 2013.

Notes

Paralympic athletes of Russia
Athletes (track and field) at the 2012 Summer Paralympics
Paralympic gold medalists for Russia
Living people
1988 births
Medalists at the 2012 Summer Paralympics
Russian female sprinters
People from Sterlitamak
Paralympic medalists in athletics (track and field)
Sportspeople from Bashkortostan
21st-century Russian people